Cystodermella elegans is a fungus species in the genus Cystodermella. It was described in 1927 in Congo.

References

External links

Agaricaceae
Fungi described in 1927